My Poor Beloved Mother (Spanish:Pobre mi madre querida) is a 1948 Argentine drama film directed by Homero Manzi and Ralph Pappier and starring Hugo del Carril, Emma Gramatica, and Aída Luz. It was based on a tango of the same name by Pascual Contursi and José Betinotti.

Cast
 Hugo del Carril    
 Emma Gramatica   
 Aída Luz   
 Graciela Lecube  
 Horacio Priani   
 María Esther Buschiazzo
 Leticia Scury  
 Pablo Cumo   
 José Franco  
 Julián Bourges  
 Julián Freire

References

Bibliography 
 Plazaola, Luis Trelles. South American Cinema. La Editorial, UPR, 1989.

External links 

1948 films
Argentine drama films
1948 drama films
1940s Spanish-language films
Films directed by Ralph Pappier
Films scored by Alejandro Gutiérrez del Barrio
Argentine black-and-white films
Films shot in Buenos Aires
1940s Argentine films